Q'illu Q'asa (Quechua q'illu yellow, q'asa mountain pass, "yellow mountain pass", hispanicized spelling Quellu Casa) is a mountain in the Potosí mountain range of the Bolivian Andes, about 4,960 m (16,273  ft) high. It is situated in the Potosí Department, southeast of Potosí. Q'illu Q'asa lies near Q'illu Urqu.

References 

Mountains of Potosí Department